The Paradise Project is a non-profit organization founded in 2004 that is "dedicated to celebrating and connecting diverse independent free thinkers who are deeply spiritual about science and nature." The organization hosts pantheism.com and aims to spread awareness about pantheism through social media, meetings, meditation gatherings, and book borrowing programs.  It hosts a Facebook fan page about pantheism with over 300,000 fans and group pages with over 15,000 members.

In 2015, Los Angeles muralist Levi Ponce was commissioned by the Project to paint the 75-foot long mural Luminaries of Pantheism for its headquarters in Venice, California. The mural was conceived by the Project's founder, Perry Rod, and designed by graphic designer Peter Moriarty. The painting depicts Albert Einstein, Alan Watts, Baruch Spinoza, Terence McKenna, Carl Jung, Carl Sagan, Emily Dickinson, Nikola Tesla, Friedrich Nietzsche, Ralph Waldo Emerson, W.E.B. Du Bois, Henry David Thoreau, Elizabeth Cady Stanton, Rumi, Adi Shankara, and Lao Tzu.

A documentary of the mural “Luminaries” by film director Ed Moy was awarded the Audience Award at the Marina Del Rey film festival. It features The Paradise Project’s Chairman, board members Nika Avila and Chuck Beebe, mural designer Peter Moriarty, muralist Levi Ponce.

References

External links
The Paradise Project

Pantheist organizations
Non-profit organizations based in California
2004 establishments in California